Acrotona is a genus of rove beetles in the family Staphylinidae. There are at least 30 described species in Acrotona.

Species

References

Further reading

 
 
 
 
 
 
 
 

Aleocharinae